Anwarul Azim is a Bangladesh Nationalist Party politician and the former Member of Parliament from Comilla-10. He has served in the Bangladesh Army as an engineer and retired as colonel, before moving on to become a pioneer of the garments industry as chairman of Alana Group.

Career
Col. M. Anwarul Azim began his military career when he enlisted in the 2nd War Course of the Pakistan Armed Forces. After the independence of Bangladesh, he became an officer of the newly established Bangladesh Army eventually retired as a colonel.

After a successful career in the Armed forces, Col. Azim entered civilian life as one of the pioneers of the garments industry. The launch of his first factory, Alana Garments Ltd. grew to become what is now known as Alana Group, a conglomerate of ready made garment factories with operations in Dhaka, Chittagong, Mymensingh, currently headquartered in Mohakhali DOHS Dhaka.

He was elected to Parliament in 2001 from Comilla-10 as a Bangladesh Nationalist Party candidate. He contested the 2019 general elections also as a Bangladesh Nationalist Party candidate. His car was attacked by activists of Bangladesh Chhatra League and Swechchhasebak League on 24 December 2015. In 2016 he was made the Organizing Secretary of Comilla division unit of Bangladesh Nationalist Party.

References

Living people
Year of birth missing (living people)
People from Comilla District
Bangladesh Army officers
Bangladesh Nationalist Party politicians
8th Jatiya Sangsad members